, the Istanbul Metro has 133 stations in operation on eight metro lines (115 including also the two funiculars operated by Metro İstanbul A.Ş.). 81 are on the European side while 52 are on the Asian side. The first stations to open were Aksaray, Emniyet—Fatih, Topkapı—Ulubatlı, Bayrampaşa—Maltepe, Sağmalcılar and Kocatepe all which opened on 3 September 1989 on the M1. The system currently has 83 stations under construction and 13 stations planned.

Operational stations

By district

Under construction stations

There are 50 stations under construction.

Planned Stations

External links
 Istanbul Metro Network

Istanbul metro stations
Istanbul